Duane Causwell (born May 31, 1968) is an American retired professional basketball player who was selected by the Sacramento Kings with the 18th overall pick of the 1990 NBA draft. He played 11 years in the National Basketball Association for the Kings and the Miami Heat averaging 4.9 ppg in his career. Causwell played college basketball at Temple University.

Causwell played high school basketball at Benjamin N. Cardozo High School in Queens.

References

External links

1968 births
Living people
African-American basketball players
Basketball players from New York City
Centers (basketball)
Miami Heat players
People from Bayside, Queens
Sacramento Kings draft picks
Sacramento Kings players
Sportspeople from Queens, New York
Temple Owls men's basketball players
American men's basketball players
Benjamin N. Cardozo High School alumni
21st-century African-American people
20th-century African-American sportspeople